John Stuart Beer (born 15 March 1944) is a priest in the Church of England and former Archdeacon of Cambridge.

Beer was at Roundhay School and Pembroke College, Oxford.  After working in advertising with  Rowntree's in York he was ordained in 1972. He became a curate at St John the Baptist's Knaresborough and then a fellow and chaplain at Fitzwilliam College, Cambridge. After this he became the Rector of Toft and then the Vicar of Grantchester.  He was Archdeacon of Huntingdon from 1997 until his appointment to Ely in 2004. He retired in 2014.

References

1944 births
People educated at Roundhay School
Alumni of Pembroke College, Oxford
Fellows of Fitzwilliam College, Cambridge
Archdeacons of Huntingdon
Archdeacons of Ely
Living people